The Hwabaek or Council of nobles, served as the chief royal council in Silla, it is  composed of the nobles of higher rank( Jingol) and headed by the Sangdaedeung.  The Hwabaek council decided the most important state affairs, such as succession to the throne and declarations of war.
 
Hwabaek Council(和白會議) are held only when the state has important events, attendees at the council are only nobles(群官, 百官). It was also a unanimous, not majority, system in which a single opponent would not pass the plan.
The venue for the Hwabaek Council was decided by taking turns to four sacred places in Silla. 
It is presumed that the king participated in the early days of the Silla.
This is confirmed at the monument of Jijeung of Silla and the Monument of Beopheung of Silla.
In 531 the head of the aristocracy, Sangdaedeung was appointed as the presiding, from which time the king left the meeting and the new head of the aristocracy, Sangdaedeung presided over the council.

The council made a decision to depose the Jinji of Silla, who believed that there was a flaw in his performance as a king, and put it into practice.
Later, from the era of Munmu of Silla and Sinmun of Silla the royal authority became stronger and the status of Sangdaedeung and Hwabaek Council weakened. It will be revived briefly at the end of Silla, when the royal authority falls.

See also
Book of Sui, Silla Records
Old Book of Tang, Silla Records

References

Political history of Korea
Silla
Historical legislatures